Marko Ilešič is a judge at the European Court of Justice since 2004. He was born in 1947 and is a former Vice-Dean and Dean at the Faculty of Law at the University of Ljubljana. He was the president of the Football Association of Yugoslavia, and later a Board of Appeal Member of UEFA and FIFA.

References

Living people
1947 births
European Court of Justice judges
Slovenian judges of international courts and tribunals
Date of birth missing (living people)